The sixth edition of Gent–Wevelgem – In Flanders Fields was held on Sunday 26 March 2016. It was the  women's event of Gent–Wevelgem cycling race, held in Belgium. It was the fourth race of the 2017 UCI Women's World Tour season.

Finland's Lotta Lepistö won the race in a bunch sprint finish ahead of home rider Jolien D'Hoore American Coryn Rivera completed the podium.

Route

Kemmelberg

The Kemmelberg is the centerpiece of the race. This edition, the second ascent of the Kemmelberg was addressed via its steepest road. The first ascent was via the traditional route with a maximum gradient of 17% but, the second was addressed via this steeper road, which has a maximum gradient of 23% near the top. Race director Hans De Clercq stated that it is a tribute to the historical significance of the Kemmelberg, as it is that road being used the first time the Kemmelberg was included in the men's race, in 1955. According to COTACOL, a Belgian standard work that has examined and graded every climb in the country, the "new" Kemmelberg ascent is the toughest climb in all Flemish races. They have given it an overall score of 183 points, which is more than the Koppenberg, the Muur van Geraardsbergen or the traditional Kemmelberg road.

Teams
25 teams competed in the race.

Result

See also
 2017 in women's road cycling

Notes

References

External links

2017 in Belgian sport
2017 UCI Women's World Tour
2017
UCI